The longest winning streaks in National Basketball Association (NBA) history are presented on two lists. One list counts only regular-season games, including streaks that started in one season and carried over into the following season. The other list is made up of playoff games only.

The Los Angeles Lakers own the longest winning streak in NBA history.

The Los Angeles Lakers appear six times across both lists, with four streaks over 15 games in the regular-season and two over ten games in the postseason. The Boston Celtics appear five times, with all five streaks in the regular-season. The Milwaukee Bucks also appear five times, with all five streaks in the regular season. The San Antonio Spurs appear four times, with 2 streaks in the regular-season and 2 in the postseason.

Key

Streaks

Regular season
This list contains only the top streaks consisting entirely of regular-season games.

Playoffs
This list contains only streaks consisting entirely of postseason games. Streaks that spanned consecutive postseasons are included here.

See also
List of NBA teams by single season win percentage
List of NBA regular season records

References

External links
NBA.com: All-Time Winning Streaks
Basketball Reference.com list of longest winning streaks, regular season only
Basketball Reference.com list of longest winning streaks, postseason only
Basketball Reference.com list of longest winning streaks, including playoff games
 Land of Basketball
Streaks Visualization

National Basketball Association longest winning streaks